The black-rumped magpie (Pica bottanensis) is a species of magpie found in central Bhutan to west-central China. It was formerly classified as a subspecies of the Eurasian magpie (Pica pica).

A molecular phylogenetic study published in 2018 found that the black-rumped magpie is a sister taxon to the Asir magpie from southwestern Saudi Arabia.

References 

Pica (genus)
Birds described in 1840
Birds of Bhutan
Birds of China